This is the complete list of men's Olympic medalists in cycling.

Current program

Road cycling

Road race, individual

Time trial, individual

Track cycling

Keirin

Madison

Omnium

Pursuit, team

Sprint, individual

Sprint, team 

Introduced in the 2000 Summer Olympics in Sydney, Australia, the team sprint is effectively a 750-metre team time trial, with a rider peeling off at the end of each lap. since its introduction, the event has been dominated by Great Britain, with three wins from the six occasions on which the event was held, and two silver medals. Jason Kenny holds the record of three gold and one silver medal in the event, having been a part of the winning team on three consecutive occasions between 2008 and 2016. France, the first winners of the event in Sydney, are the only nation to have won a medal in every edition, with 1 gold, 2 silvers and 3 bronze medals.

Netherlands hold the Olympic record in the event of 41.469 seconds, set in the delayed Tokyo Olympic Games of 2020.

Mountain bike

Cross-country

BMX

Freestyle

Racing

Discontinued events

Road cycling

Road race, team

Time trial, team

Track cycling

Early Games (1896–1908) 
During the first four Games of the Olympiad, track cycling events were held over various distances that were contested at one or two Games only.

50 km

Points race

Pursuit, individual

Tandem

Time trial

All-time medal table (Men's) 1896–Present

See also 
 Cycling at the 1906 Intercalated Games — these Intercalated Games are no longer regarded as official Games by the International Olympic Committee

References 

 International Olympic Committee results database
 Encyclopædia Britannica

List of medalists (men)
Cycling (men)
Cycling (men)
 
Olympic
Cycling at the Summer Olympics – Men's individual time trial